This is a list of schools within Harris County, Texas in Greater Houston.

Public schools
This is a list of school districts entirely or partially within in Harris County, Texas, with the schools of the latter that are in the county documented here.

All schools within the following districts are within Harris County:
 Aldine ISD
 Alief ISD
 Channelview ISD
 Crosby ISD
 Cypress-Fairbanks ISD
 Deer Park ISD
 Galena Park ISD
 Goose Creek CISD (as of 2022, while the district has territory in Chambers County it does not operate schools within Chambers County)
 Houston ISD (See the list of schools)
 Humble ISD  (as of 2022, its one school in Montgomery County, Kingwood Park High School, is also within Harris County, as in it is on the county line)
 Klein ISD
 La Porte ISD  (as of 2022, while the district has territory in Chambers County it does not operate schools within Chambers County)
 Pasadena ISD
 Sheldon ISD
 Spring ISD
 Spring Branch ISD
 Defunct
 North Forest ISD

The following lists schools within districts partially within Harris County:

Clear Creek ISD
Zoned high schools
Clear Brook High School (Unincorporated Harris County)
Clear Lake High School (Houston)

Alternative high schools
Clear Horizons Early College High School (Houston)
Clear View Education Center (Webster)
Intermediate schools
Brookside Intermediate School (Harris Co. By Friendswood)
Creek Side Intermediate (League City)
Clear Lake Intermediate School (Houston)
Seabrook Intermediate School (Seabrook)
Space Center Intermediate School (Houston)
Westbrook Intermediate School (Houston, formerly Webster Intermediate School in Webster)
Elementary schools
Armand Bayou Elementary School (Houston)
Bay Elementary School (Seabrook)
Brookwood Elementary School (Pasadena)
Clear Lake City Elementary School (Houston)
Falcon Pass Elementary School (Houston)
P. H. Greene Elementary School (Unincorporated Harris County by Friendswood/)
Landolt Elementary School (Unincorporated Harris Countynear Friendswood)
Margaret S. McWhirter Elementary School (Webster)
North Pointe Elementary School (Houston)
G. W. Robinson Elementary School (Pasadena)
Ward Elementary School (Houston)
Arlyne and Alan Weber Elementary School (Unincorporated Harris County)
Wedgewood Elementary School (Friendswood)
G. H. Whitcomb Elementary School (Houston)
White Elementary School (El Lago)

Katy ISD
Zoned high schools
James E. Taylor High School (Unincorporated Harris County) (Est. 1979)
1994-1996 National Blue Ribbon School
Mayde Creek High School (Unincorporated Harris County) (Est. 1984)
1994-1996 National Blue Ribbon School
Morton Ranch High School (Unincorporated Harris County) (Est. 2004)
Zoned junior high schools
Cardiff Junior High School (Unincorporated Harris County) (Est. 2008-09)
Katy Junior High School (Katy) (Est. 1965 next to Katy High School, present location 1995)
Mayde Creek Junior High School (Unincorporated Harris County) (Est. 1980)
1999-2000 National Blue Ribbon School
Memorial Parkway Junior High School (Unincorporated Harris County) (Est. 1982)
1999-2000 National Blue Ribbon School
T. H. McDonald Junior High School (Unincorporated Harris County) (Est. 1991)
Garland McMeans Junior High School (Unincorporated Harris County) (Est. 2000)
Morton Ranch Junior High School (Unincorporated Harris County) (Est. 2003)
West Memorial Junior High School (Unincorporated Harris County) (Est. 1976)

County-operated schools
In addition the Harris County Department of Education, which is not classified as a school district under Texas law, operates several special Education and alternative schools.

State-chartered charter schools

 Charter school organizations
 Harmony Public Schools
 KIPP Houston
 The Varnett Public School
 YES Prep Public Schools
 Individual schools
 Amigos Por Vida Friends For Life Charter School
 Aristoi Classical Academy
 Juan B. Galaviz Charter School
 Houston Heights High School
 George I. Sanchez Charter Schools
 SER-Niños Charter School
 University of Houston Charter School (closing 2021)
 Yes Prep Northline
 Raul Yzaguirre School for Success
 Defunct
 Benji's Special Educational Academy
 Girls and Boys Preparatory Academy
 Jamie's House Charter School
 High School for Business and Economic Success, became an HISD charter named Leader's Academy High School for Business and Academic Success in 2007 and later merged into Victory Prep
 Medical Center Charter School, a pre-kindergarten through 5th grade charter school, was located in the Westbury area. Despite its name, the school is not located in the Texas Medical Center area. Medical Center Charter School opened in 1996, and catered to employees working in the Medical Center and had the Montessori method, used until grade two. Its specialty as of 2003 was foreign languages. In 2014 the Texas Education Agency (TEA) announced that the school's performance was insufficient and that it sought to revoke its charter. By 2018 its charter had closed.
 Victory Preparatory Academy (became an HISD charter in 2016, closed in 2018)

Private schools

Secular private schools
 Alexander-Smith Academy - Houston
 Awty International School (French School of Houston) - Houston
 The Briarwood School - Houston
 British International School of Houston - Unincorporated area in Greater Katy (formerly in Houston)
 Chinquapin Preparatory School - Highlands, unincorporated area
 The Harris School - Houston
 The Kinkaid School - Piney Point Village
 Memorial Private High School - Houston
 Mirus Academy - City of Katy
 The Monarch School - Houston
 The Parish School - Houston
 The Post Oak School - Bellaire and Houston
 The Rainard School - Houston
 School of the Woods - Houston and Hilshire Village
 St. John's School - Houston
 Houston Sudbury School - Houston
 The Tenney School - Houston
 The Village School - Houston
 The Woodlands Preparatory School - The Woodlands, unincorporated area
 Robindell Private School (Kindergarten and grade 1) - In Gulfton, Houston
 Trafton Academy (K-8) - in Willowbend, Houston, Opened in 1973
 Melinda Webb School (infants to 7 years old) - Located in the Texas Medical Center, it is operated by the Center for Hearing and Speech and was previously at 3636 W. Dallas. The school serves as a day school for children not yet mainstreamed into regular classrooms and a speech and therapy center for those that are. Previously known as the Houston School for Deaf Children, it was given its current name, after a deaf girl, in 1997. The girl died of leukemia circa 1958; a former student of the school, she had been the first area deaf child to be mainstreamed into a public school, as she began attending one in Texas City in 1954. Her father, Frank Webb, donated $1 million to what became the Melinda Webb School in 2002. That year its enrollment was 35-40. In 2020 it began admitting preschool students without hearing difficulties to provide a more mainstream environment.

Religious private schools
 Roman Catholic
 See List of schools in the Roman Catholic Archdiocese of Galveston–Houston as almost all of them are in Harris County
 Protestant Christian
 Baytown Christian Academy - Baytown
 Christian Life Center Academy - Kingwood, Houston
 Concordia Lutheran High School - Tomball
 The Covenant Preparatory School - Kingwood, Houston
 Cypress Christian School - Cypress, unincorporated area
 Episcopal High School - Bellaire
 Faith West Academy - Unincorporated area, Greater Katy
 Family Christian Academy - Channelview, unincorporated area
 Grace Christian Academy - Clear Lake City and Houston
 Highlands Latin School, a private K-12 Christian School, is in Meyerland Section 3. The campus previously housed Pilgrim Lutheran School, a private K-8 Christian School, which later closed its K-8 section and now only has early childhood.
 Lutheran High School North (Texas) - Houston
 Lutheran South Academy - Houston
 Northland Christian School - Unincorporated area
 The Oaks Adventist Christian School - Unincorporated area
 River Oaks Baptist School - Houston
 Rosehill Christian School - Rose Hill, unincorporated area
 Second Baptist School - Houston
 St. Francis Episcopal School - Houston and Piney Point Village
 St. Stephen's Episcopal School - Houston
 St. Thomas Episcopal School - Houston
 Westbury Christian School - Houston
 St. Mark's Episcopal School - West University Place
 St. Nicholas School (K-8) is an Anglican school. In 1987 the school was established, and in 1993 it opened the Saint Nicholas School II campus in the Texas Medical Center.  residents of apartment complexes make up about 25% of the parents of the students, and the school rents from Bethany United Methodist Church. It will later occupy a new development on a  property along South Main Street, in the 5 Corners District.
 Veritas Christian Academy of Houston in Bellaire
 Yellowstone Academy - Houston
 Greek Orthodox
 Annunciation Orthodox School - Houston
 Jewish
 Robert M. Beren Academy - Houston
 The Emery/Weiner School - Houston
 Torah Day School of Houston - Houston
 Beth Yeshurun Day School - Houston
 Shlenker School - Houston
 Muslim
 Al-Hadi School of Accelerative Learning - Houston
 Iman Academy - Houston
 Islamic Education Institute of Texas (Darul Arqam Schools) - Multiple campuses in Harris County, some in Houston, some in unincorporated areas
 Defunct
 Mount Carmel High School (Houston)
 North Houston Baptist School - Houston
 Pilgrim Lutheran School (K-8), in Meyerland, Houston It now only has early childhood as its K-8 section closed, with Highlands Latin School occupying the space.

See also
 List of schools in Houston - Includes parts of Houston in Fort Bend and Montgomery counties

References

 
Education in Houston
Harris